Coldstream is a census-designated place (CDP) in southern Anderson Township, Hamilton County, Ohio, United States. The population was 1,322 at the 2020 census.

Geography
Coldstream is located at  near the southeastern corner of Hamilton County. It is situated between Interstate 275 and the Ohio River. The CDP takes its name from the Coldstream Country Club and occupies the bluffs overlooking the Ohio River.

References

Census-designated places in Hamilton County, Ohio
Census-designated places in Ohio